Vyacheslav Alekseyevich Zaytsev (born 12 November 1952) is a Russian former volleyball player who competed for the Soviet Union in the 1976 Summer Olympics, in the 1980 Summer Olympics, and in the 1988 Summer Olympics.

Zaytsev was born in Leningrad. In 1976, he was part of the Soviet team which won the silver medal in the Olympic tournament. He played all five matches.

Four years later, he won a gold medal with the Soviet team in the 1980 Olympic tournament. He played five matches. With the Soviet Union, Zaytsev won two other Olympic silver medals, two World Championships and six European titles.

He was a major player to help Soviet Union men's national volleyball team to dominate the World in late 1970s to early 1980s by winning 1977 FIVB Men's World Cup, 1978 FIVB Men's World Championship, 1980 Moscow Olympic Games, 1981 FIVB Men's World Cup and 1982 FIVB Men's World Championship in row.

At the 1988 Games, he was a member of the Soviet team which won the silver medal in the Olympic tournament. He played five matches. Zaytsev played for Avtomobilist Leningrad (now Spartak St. Petersburg), with which he won two CEV Top Teams Cup and two Challenge Cups in 1982–1983. He finished his career in Italy, playing in Spoleto, Agrigento and Città di Castello.

Family
He is married to Irina Pozdnyakova, a former competitive swimmer. They have a daughter, Anna (born 1975), and a son, Ivan, who is an Olympic volleyball player. Both children hold Italian citizenship: Ivan was born on 2 October 1988 in Italy, where his father played for several years, whereas Anna married an Italian in 1993.

References

1952 births
Living people
Sportspeople from Saint Petersburg
Soviet men's volleyball players
Olympic volleyball players of the Soviet Union
Volleyball players at the 1976 Summer Olympics
Volleyball players at the 1980 Summer Olympics
Volleyball players at the 1988 Summer Olympics
Olympic gold medalists for the Soviet Union
Olympic silver medalists for the Soviet Union
Russian volleyball coaches
Olympic medalists in volleyball
Russian men's volleyball players
Coaches of Russia men's national volleyball team
Medalists at the 1988 Summer Olympics
Medalists at the 1980 Summer Olympics
Medalists at the 1976 Summer Olympics
Competitors at the 1986 Goodwill Games
Goodwill Games medalists in volleyball